Citrus is a census-designated place (CDP) in Los Angeles County, California,  United States. It is located in the San Gabriel Valley between Azusa to the north and west, Glendora to the east, and Covina to the south. Generally, this is referred to by locals as "unincorporated Covina" or "unincorporated Azusa", or simply "Azusa" or "Covina". The population was 10,866 at the 2010 census, up from 10,581 at the 2000 census. Citrus is named after Citrus Avenue, which passes through the community.

Geography
Citrus is located at  (34.114891, -117.891786).

Demographics

2010
At the 2010 census Citrus had a population of 10,866. The racial makeup of Citrus was 5,898 (54.3%) White (16.1% Non-Hispanic White), 240 (2.2%) African American, 120 (1.1%) Native American, 860 (7.9%) Asian, 4 (0.0%) Pacific Islander, 3,302 (30.4%) from other races, and 442 (4.1%) from two or more races. Hispanic or Latino of any race were 7,911 persons (72.8%).

The census reported that 10,841 people (99.8% of the population) lived in households, 25 (0.2%) lived in non-institutionalized group quarters, and no one was institutionalized.

There were 2,615 households, 1,364 (52.2%) had children under the age of 18 living in them, 1,524 (58.3%) were opposite-sex married couples living together, 442 (16.9%) had a female householder with no husband present, 229 (8.8%) had a male householder with no wife present.  There were 152 (5.8%) unmarried opposite-sex partnerships, and 24 (0.9%) same-sex married couples or partnerships. 278 households (10.6%) were one person and 94 (3.6%) had someone living alone who was 65 or older. The average household size was 4.15.  There were 2,195 families (83.9% of households); the average family size was 4.33.

The age distribution was 3,083 people (28.4%) under the age of 18, 1,322 people (12.2%) aged 18 to 24, 3,208 people (29.5%) aged 25 to 44, 2,402 people (22.1%) aged 45 to 64, and 851 people (7.8%) who were 65 or older.  The median age was 30.7 years. For every 100 females, there were 102.2 males.  For every 100 females age 18 and over, there were 101.1 males.

There were 2,701 housing units at an average density of 3,040.3 per square mile, of the occupied units 1,854 (70.9%) were owner-occupied and 761 (29.1%) were rented. The homeowner vacancy rate was 1.7%; the rental vacancy rate was 3.5%.  7,841 people (72.2% of the population) lived in owner-occupied housing units and 3,000 people (27.6%) lived in rental housing units.

According to the 2010 United States Census, the median household income was $59,919, with 10.9% of the population living below the federal poverty line.

2000
At the 2000 census there were 10,581 people, 2,614 households, and 2,174 families in the CDP. The population density was 11,784.8 inhabitants per square mile (4,539.3/km). The racial makeup of the CDP was 52.38% White, 3.24% Black or African American, 1.54% Native American, 6.73% Asian, 0.05% Pacific Islander, 31.12% from other races, and 4.94% from two or more races.  64.84% of the population were Hispanic or Latino of any race.
Of the 2,614 households 47.0% had children under the age of 18 living with them, 59.4% were married couples living together, 16.6% had a female householder with no husband present, and 16.8% were non-families. 11.1% of households were one person and 3.2% were one person aged 65 or older.  The average household size was 4.03 and the average family size was 4.29.

The age distribution was 33.0% under the age of 18, 12.1% from 18 to 24, 31.3% from 25 to 44, 17.1% from 45 to 64, and 6.5% 65 or older.  The median age was 28 years. For every 100 females, there were 98.9 males.  For every 100 females age 18 and over, there were 94.9 males.

The median household income was $55,110 and the median family income  was $53,668. Males had a median income of $32,289 versus $27,459 for females. The per capita income for the CDP was $15,848.  About 8.5% of families and 12.8% of the population were below the poverty line, including 14.6% of those under age 18 and 9.0% of those age 65 or over.

Government

References

Communities in the San Gabriel Valley
Census-designated places in Los Angeles County, California
Census-designated places in California